Österfärnebo is a locality situated in Sandviken Municipality, Gävleborg County, Sweden with 483 inhabitants in 2010.

Sports
The following sports clubs are located in Österfärnebo:

 Österfärnebo IF

References 

Populated places in Sandviken Municipality
Gästrikland